Lilan may refer to:
 Lilan, minor character in the video gameSuikoden IV
 Lilan, East Azerbaijan, a village in Hamadan Province, Iran
 Lilan, Hamadan, a village in Hamadan Province, Iran
 Lilan, Markazi, a village in Markazi Province, Iran